The name Palmoni appears in the original Hebrew in the biblical book of Daniel. The still widely used King James Version of 1611 refers to Palmoni indirectly as "that certain saint" – "or," as a marginal note from the translators says, "the numberer of secrets, or, the wonderful numberer: Heb. Palmoni."

In Daniel 8:14, Palmoni identifies a period of 2,300 days before the cleansing of the sanctuary, an event evidently desired by the prophet Daniel, would take place.

According to the day-year principle of interpreting Biblical prophecy, 2,300 "days" would indicate 2,300 years. The Swiss astronomer Jean-Philippe de Cheseaux found, during his studies of chronology that if he took the period of 2,300 years and subtracted from it 1,260 years – a number referred to indirectly in Daniel as "a time and times and the dividing of time" (Dan. 7:25) or "a time, times, and a half" (Dan. 12:7), where a time is equal to 360, times are equal to 720 (2 × 360), and a half is equal to 180 (360/2) – he got 1,040 years, which proved to be, according to the 19th-century theological author Henry Grattan Guinness, "the largest accurate soli-lunar cycle known."

The astrologer Walter Gorn Old, writing under the nom de plume Sepharial, added from his own early 20th-century research, "I have made a calculation and find that with a solar year equal to 365.242264 days, we get in 1040 such years exactly 12,863 lunations, each of 29 days, 12 hours, 44 minutes, 2.8 seconds, which does not differ from the most recent astronomical estimate by a single second."

Two 19th-century writers wrote entire books entitled Palmoni: Francis John Bodfield Hooper was the author of Palmoni: An Essay of the Chronological and Numerical Systems in Use Among the Ancient Jews (1851) and Milo Mahan penned Palmoni, or, The Numerals of Scripture (1863).

References

Book of Daniel
Individual angels
Christian saints from the Old Testament